Palmerton Area High School is a four-year public high school in Palmerton, Carbon County, Pennsylvania, in the United States. Palmerton Area High School is the sole high school operated by Palmerton Area School District. In the 2021–2022 school year, enrollment was 467 pupils in 9th through 12th grades. The junior high and senior high share a single building. 

High school students may choose to attend the Carbon Career and Technical Institute for training in the construction and mechanical trades. The Carbon-Lehigh Intermediate Unit IU21 provides the school with a wide variety of services like: specialized education for disabled students; state mandated training on recognizing and reporting child abuse; speech and visual disability services; criminal background check processing for prospective employees and professional development for staff and faculty.

The school colors are blue and white, and the athletic teams are the Blue Bombers. The first graduating class from the current school was that of 1966.  The previous high school building is now occupied by the Stephen S. Palmer Elementary School.

Extracurriculars
Palmerton Area High School offers a wide variety of clubs, activities and an extensive, publicly funded sports program.

Athletics
Palmerton Area High School competes in District XI tournaments, and is part of the Colonial League and the Pennsylvania Interscholastic Athletic Association (PIAA). The school joined the Colonial League in 1994.

The district's sports teams include:

Varsity

Boys
Baseball - AAA (2016 district champions)
Basketball - AAA
Cross country - A
Football - AA
Golf - AA
Soccer - AA
Tennis - AA
Track and field - AA
Wrestling - AA

Girls
Basketball - AAA
Cross country - A
Field hockey - A
Soccer - AA
Softball - AAA
Track and field - AA
Volleyball - AA

According to the PIAA directory July 2016

Sports history
From 1977 to 1993, Palmerton was a member of the Centennial League, which also included Pocono Mountain, East Stroudsburg, Stroudsburg, Pleasant Valley, Lehighton, Northern Lehigh, Northwestern Lehigh, and Notre Dame (Green Pond).  By 1993, increasingly large enrollments in the AAAA schools in the Poconos from Monroe County (Pocono Mountain, Pleasant Valley, Stroudsburg, and East Stroudsburg) had left the league dominated by these larger schools with disparity in the quality of the athletic programs. In 1994, these schools and Lehighton created a new league called the Mountain Valley Conference (MVC).  Though in a different league, Lehighton has remained a geographical rival to Palmerton; the schools still compete with one another in most sports.  In 2011 and 2012 the Palmerton Area School Board considered reducing its athletic programs to six sports for budgetary reasons.  However, a parents' group raised more than $43,000 in an attempt to keep six Palmerton High sports teams from being eliminated.

References

External links

Palmerton Area High School sports coverage at The Express-Times

Public high schools in Pennsylvania
Schools in Carbon County, Pennsylvania